Omsk-Severnyy is an airbase of the Russian Air Force located near Omsk, Omsk Oblast, Russia.

The base was home to the 64th Fighter Aviation Regiment between 1956 and 1998 with the Mikoyan MiG-31 (ASCC: Foxhound).

References

Russian Air Force bases